Hoo may refer to:

People
Hoo (surname), including a list of people with the name
Thomas Hoo, Baron Hoo and Hastings (c. 1396 – 1455)

Places
Hoo, Suffolk, England
Hoo Peninsula, in Kent, England
Hoo St Werburgh, or simply Hoo
Hoo Fort
Hoo Junction railway station
 Hoo Stack, an island off Nesting, Shetland, Scotland
The Hoo, a house in the London Borough of Camden
The Hoo, a small hill outside Chipping Campden, Gloucestershire
The Hoo, Great Gaddesden, a country house in Hertfordshire
Mount Hōō, in Yamanashi Prefecture, Japan
Hooton railway station, Cheshire, England, station code HOO

Other uses
Hoo (film), a 2010 Indian film
Hōō, Japanese name for the fenghuang
ISO 639:hoo, the Holoholo language, a Bantu language of DR Congo
Croatian Olympic Committee, ( (HOO))

See also

Hoohoo (disambiguation)
Hooe (disambiguation)
Hu (disambiguation)
Who (disambiguation)
 Sutton Hoo, a medieval burial site in Suffolk, England